Mohamed Valiulla (1899 - 19 December 1960) was an Indian politician. He was a Member of the Mysore Constituent Assembly from 1948 to 1950. He also served as a Member of the Mysore Legislative Assembly from 1950 to 1952 and Member of Rajya Sabha (the upper house of the Parliament of India) twice from 1952 to 1958 and from 1958 to 1960. He was a member of the Indian National Congress.

Position held

References 

1899 births
1960 deaths
Rajya Sabha members from Karnataka
Indian National Congress politicians from Karnataka